Nanette Salomons Cohen (after marriage, Nanette Pressburg; c 1764 – 1833) was a Dutch citizen known for being the maternal grandmother of Karl Marx, the socialist philosopher and economist.

Life 
Nanette Salomons Cohen was born in 1764. Her parents were Salomon (1731–1804) and Sara Cohen-Chazzan (1736–1810) (sometimes called Barent-Cohen) in Amsterdam, the family belonging to Amsterdam's Jewish community. Her paternal grandfather was Barent Cohen, a wealthy merchant.

In 1785, Nanette Cohen married Isaac Heymans Pressburg (1747–1832) of Nijmegen. 
The Pressburgs were a prosperous family, Isaac working as a textile merchant. They were leading members of Nijmegen's Jewish community, Isaac acting as cantor of the synagogue where his father, Hirschl (or Chaim) Pressburg, had been the rabbi. They initially lived in Nonnenstraat near the synagogue, before moving to a larger house on Grotestraat in 1808. 

Nanette died in Nijmegen on April 7, 1833, at the age of 69, her husband having died the previous year.

Children and their legacy 
Isaac and Nanette Pressburg had five children, three boys and two girls. The first, Hijam, was born on August 16, 1786; followed by Henriette on September 20, 1788; David on February 5 1791; Marcus Martin on November 22, 1793; and finally Sophie on November 15, 1797.

In 1814, Henriette married Hirschel (later Heinrich) Marx in the Nijmegen Synagogue, the couple moving to Heinrich's home town of Trier in the Rhineland, where Heinrich worked successfully as a lawyer. Their nine children included Karl Marx.

In 1820, Sophie married the tobacco merchant Lion Philips, moving to the Dutch town of Zaltbommel. After Nanette's death, Lion Philips acted as trustee for her legacy on behalf of the family. Karl Marx, their nephew, occasionally visited the Philips family, and regularly corresponded with Lion. Lion and Sophie's son  and grandson Gerard Philips founded the Philips Electronics Company in 1891.

Although both daughters and their immediate families converted from Judaism to Christianity – Henriette in 1825 and Sophie in 1826 – they remained in regular contact with their mother, one of Karl Marx's younger brothers being born in Nijmegen.

Of the Pressburgs' sons, David became a lawyer in Amsterdam and later in Paramaribo in Surinam, while Marcus remained in Nijmegen in the tobacco trade.

References

Sources
Genealogical information:

1764 births
1833 deaths
Dutch Jews
Karl Marx
Jewish women
People from Amsterdam
Cohen family